Royal Air Force Selsey or more simply RAF Selsey is a former Royal Air Force Advanced Landing Ground located 2 miles north east of Selsey, West Sussex and 5 miles south of Chichester, West Sussex, England.

The following units were here at some point:
 No. 121 Airfield RAF
 No. 65 Squadron RAF (1943)
 No. 245 Squadron RAF (1943)
 No. 135 Airfield RAF (renamed No. 135 (Fighter) Wing RAF on 15 May 1944)
 No. 222 Squadron RAF (1944)
 No. 349 (Belgian) Squadron RAF (1944)
 No. 485 Squadron RNZAF (1944)
 No. 145 (French) (Fighter) Wing RAF
 No. 329 Squadron RAF (1944)
 No. 340 Squadron RAF (1944)
 No. 341 Squadron RAF (1944)
 No. 33 Squadron RAF (1944)
 No. 74 Squadron RAF (1944)
 No. 131 Airfield (Polish) RAF
 No. 421 Repair & Salvage Unit
 No. 1316 Mobile Wing RAF Regiment
 No. 2731 Squadron RAF Regiment
 No. 2800 Squadron RAF Regiment
 No. 2955 Squadron RAF Regiment

References

Citations

Bibliography

Royal Air Force stations in West Sussex